Komo is a Bantu language spoken by half a million people in the Democratic Republic of the Congo, including an area around the major upriver port of Kisangani.

References

Boan languages